MidAmerica St. Louis Airport  is a public use airport next to Scott Air Force Base. It is 14 nautical miles (16 mi, 26 km) east of the central business district of Belleville and 18 nautical miles (21 mi, 33 km) east of downtown St. Louis in St. Clair County, Illinois, United States.

Opened in 1997, MidAmerica is the secondary domestic passenger airport for the St. Louis, Missouri, metropolitan area, after the larger St. Louis Lambert International Airport. It is a joint-use airport and is currently served by one airline: Allegiant Air.

In 2018, the airport had 152,278 passenger enplanements in 2018 (302,000 total passengers), according to the Federal Aviation Administration. It was included in the National Plan of Integrated Airport Systems for 2017–21, which categorized it as a primary commercial service airport because it surpassed 10,000 annual enplanements.

It is the fifth-busiest of the 12 commercial airports In Illinois. In 2021, a Bureau of Transportation study found it among the nation's five least-expensive airports.

History
MidAmerica St. Louis Airport was created to alleviate crowding at St. Louis Lambert International Airport, but had been criticized as a pork barrel project. Featured several times on a "Fleecing of America" segment on the NBC Nightly News, it was called a "Gateway to Nowhere" by Tom Brokaw, costing taxpayers $313 million. Supporters credit MidAmerica's additional runway with saving Scott AFB from closure during BRAC 2005. They also describe MidAmerica as a "Gateway to the World", citing a new cargo terminal and customs facility designed to handle international cargo. Congestion at Lambert Airport has not been a problem since American Airlines halved hub operations in 2003 and a new billion-dollar runway opened in 2006.

As of 2021, county taxpayers have plugged nearly $125 million into the airport to fill the airport's deficits. Aside from that, the airport's biggest revenue source is fuel sales to Boeing, which test-flies drones for the U.S. Navy. The airport will be paying its construction debt from 1995 until 2045, costing taxpayers an additional $88 million.

Passenger service has increased since Allegiant Air restarted service in 2012 with flights to 12 destinations.

In 2018, MidAmerica Airport was named "Airport of the Year" for airports that see more than 10,000 passengers annually by the Illinois Department of Transportation.

Passenger airlines
Four passenger airlines have operated from MidAmerica; as of 2021, only Allegiant Airlines operates there. 

 On August 16, 2000, Pan American Airways debuted at MidAmerica airport with non-stop service between Orlando Sanford and St. Louis. The airline was hit hard by the drop in airline travel after the 9/11 attacks, and ceased to operate at the airport on December 3, 2001.
 Great Plains Airlines began service in late 2003 with flights to Chicago-Midway Airport, Washington-Dulles Airport, and Tulsa. The carrier filed for bankruptcy in January 2004 and ultimately ceased all operations.
 TransMeridian Airlines began service at Mid-America on November 21, 2004. The Atlanta-based airline filed for bankruptcy on September 29, 2005, then ceased service to all destinations.
 Allegiant Air started service from the airport on April 29, 2005, offering flights to McCarran International Airport in Las Vegas and Orlando Sanford International Airport. The airline stopped operating from MidAmerica on January 3, 2009. It resumed service on November 7, 2012, with twice-weekly direct flights between MidAmerica St. Louis Airport and Orlando/Sanford beginning on November 7, 2012. Direct flights have since been added to Fort Lauderdale, Destin / Fort Walton Beach, Jacksonville, Punta Gorda,  St. Petersburg/Clearwater, Sarasota, and Orlando Sanford, all in Florida; Myrtle Beach and Charleston in South Carolina; Phoenix/Mesa, and Las Vegas.

Facilities

Passenger facilities
From the onset, the passenger terminal was planned for easy expansion if needed. The passenger terminal sits in a 250-foot-wide by 700-foot-long expansion envelope bounded by a runway and parking lot. The initial build-out has two upper-level departure gates with jet bridges and some ground-level gates to serve smaller commuter aircraft.

In September 2020, the airport received $6.5 million in federal grants to expand the terminal. There are four phases to the terminal expansion. The first phase was completed in spring 2020. The second phase began in late 2020 and was to be completed in 2021. The final phase is to be completed by the end of 2023. The project will add 41,000 square feet to the existing terminal. This space will be used for a relocated and upgraded security checkpoint, two additional jet bridges, a service animal relief area, family restrooms, a nursing room, an expanded departure lounge and added room for concessions. It will also better accommodate people with disabilities.

Cargo facilities
 Dual Category II Instrument Landing Systems
 Simultaneous instrument approaches
 Runway 14L/32R, 10,000 feet
 Runway 14R/32L, 8,010 feet
 Unconstrained Air Traffic Control and air space environment
 Immediate Interstate access via I-64, I-44, I-55 and I-70
 Air cargo facility development sites ranging from 10 to 200+ acres
 An initial air cargo ramp of 258,000 square feet or 5.9 acres
 An air cargo terminal site adjacent to the ramp
 Air rescue and fire Index C facility, capable of adjustment, as operational requirements dictate
 New state-of-the-art control tower, 24-hours daily, seven days a week
 New fuel farm
 Aircraft handling services
 Foreign Trade Zone
 Enterprise Zone

Runways & Taxiways

 Runway 14L/32R: 10,000 by 150 feet (3,048 x 46 m), surface: concrete, ILS equipped
 Runway 14R/32L: 8,010 by 150 feet (2,441 x 46 m), surface: asphalt/concrete, ILS equipped

MidAmerica's construction included the creation of the  14L/32R (east) runway, adding  to the existing west runway, adding passenger and cargo terminals on the east side of the facility, and building a  taxiway connecting the two runways. A new air traffic control tower staffed by Air Force personnel was constructed midway between the two runways.

In September 2022, construction began on an extension to Taxiway Lima as well as a new Taxiway Bridge over Crooked Creek to connect the airport to a new aviation business park. A new Boeing Production Facility is already underway as the first tenant to build the MQ-25 unmanned aircraft.

Airlines and destinations

Passenger

Cargo
Between late 2009 and August 2010, one air cargo company, LAN Cargo, used the airport to import flowers from Bogota, Colombia, totaling one flight each week until the county abruptly ended the flights.

Both Boeing Defense, Space & Security and North Bay Produce currently have facilities on site. North Bay Produce primarily ships blueberries from Michigan and Chile into the airport; they use a completely refrigerated warehouse for packaging and distribution. Boeing uses the facility at MidAmerica for sub-assemblies for multiple military aircraft.

Boeing and North Bay have recently constructed additions to their facilities at MidAmerica Airport.

Maintenance and operations
The civil operations are administered by St. Clair County, Illinois, which also pays the maintenance costs for the east runway. Over half of all air operations at the facility utilize the eastern runway.

Statistics
USDOT's most current data indicates 308,000 passengers used BLV between January 2018 and December 2018 and the airport was ranked 204th in the United States. USDOT's Calendar Year 2016 data indicated 80,000 enplanements (157,000 total passengers), nearly triple the 2015 total. FAA's Calendar Year 2015 data indicated 32,589 enplanements (63,000 total passengers), nearly double the 2014 total. In calendar year 2014, the airport was ranked 363 in the United States with 16,328 passenger enplanements. This was a 20.57% increase over 2013. In calendar year 2013, the dual-use facility was ranked 373 in the United States with 13,542 passenger enplanements. This placed it ninth in the state of Illinois. By comparison, St. Louis Lambert International Airport was ranked 31 in the United States with over 6.21 million enplanements.

For the 12-month period ending December 31, 2020, the airport had 17,500 aircraft operations, an average of 48 per day: 57% military, 32% general aviation, and 11% scheduled commercial. At that time there were 34 aircraft based at this airport: 27 military, 5 helicopters, and 2 single engine airplanes.

Total passengers (BLV)

Public transportation

Light rail
Currently, the St. Louis region's light rail system, MetroLink, does not service MidAmerica Airport. Passengers must use ground transportation and travel to the Shiloh-Scott station adjacent to Scott Air Force Base to board trains. From this station the Red Line provides direct service to downtown St. Louis.  Additionally, MetroLink provides direct or indirect service to the Central West End, Clayton, Lambert Airport, and suburban areas in both Illinois and Missouri.

A 5.2-mile (8.4 km) expansion of the Red Line from Shiloh-Scott to MidAmerica received $96 million in funding from the State of Illinois in 2019. The expansion will include a 2.6-mile double-track section, a 2.6-mile single-track section and a passenger station at the end of the alignment at the airport. Design work was completed in the summer of 2022 and a request for proposals was released that November. Construction on the expansion is expected to begin by March 2023 and be operational by spring 2025.

Flight testing
In late April 2019, the first MQ-25 Stingray test aircraft (T-1 or "Tail 1") was taken by road from Boeing's technical plant at St. Louis's Lambert International Airport across the Mississippi River to MidAmerica St. Louis Airport, which is conjoined to Scott Air Force Base. Test flying was expected to commence at MidAmerica late in 2019, after taxi tests and the Federal Aviation Administration’s certifying the aircraft and granting airspace for flight testing. The first test flight occurred on September 19, 2019.

In Addition: "Boeing plans to build three new, state-of-the-art facilities in St. Louis,", "These facilities, as well as the new Advanced Composite Fabrication Center in Arizona, and the new MQ-25 production facility at MidAmerica St. Louis Airport, represent more than a $1 billion investment."

References

External links
 MidAmerica St. Louis Airport, official site
 Aerial image as of April 1998 from USGS The National Map
 
 

1997 establishments in Illinois
Airports in Greater St. Louis
Airports established in 1997
Airports in Illinois
Transportation buildings and structures in St. Clair County, Illinois